was a city located in Mie Prefecture, Japan. The city was founded on September 10, 1941. It was often referred to as Iga-Ueno to avoid confusion with other Uenos, including one in Ise Province which is now part of Yokkaichi.

As of 2003, the city had population estimated about 61,753 and the density was 316.26 persons per km². The total area was 195.26 km².

On November 1, 2004, Ueno, along with the towns of Iga (former) and Ayama, the villages of Ōyamada and Shimagahara (all from Ayama District), and the town of Aoyama (from Naga District), were merged to create the city of Iga.

Ueno is the location of Iga Ueno Castle and the Iga-ryū Ninja Museum.

External links
  Official website of Iga

Dissolved municipalities of Mie Prefecture
Iga, Mie